Free-living may refer to:
 a  non-parasitic organism
 a non-sessile (or free-swimming) organism